Nicole Vaidišová was the defending champion from 2005, but decided not to compete in 2006.

Eleni Daniilidou won the title, defeating Ai Sugiyama in the final, 6–3, 2–6, 7–6(7–3).

Seeds

Draw

Finals

Top half

Bottom half

Qualifying

Seeds

Qualifiers

Qualifying draw

First qualifier

Second qualifier

Third qualifier

Fourth qualifier

External links
Main and Qualifying draws

2006 Singles
Korea Open Singles
Korea Open Singles